The Yermakov Transfer is a 1974 thriller novel by the British writer Derek Lambert. The life of the Soviet President is threatened by a plan to kidnap him on the Trans-Siberian Express.

References

Bibliography
 Burton, Alan. Historical Dictionary of British Spy Fiction. Rowman & Littlefield, 2016.

1974 British novels
Novels by Derek Lambert 
British thriller novels
Novels set in Russia